Ciliary body melanoma is a type of cancer arising from the coloured part (uvea) of the eye.

About 12% of uveal melanoma arise from the ciliary body.

Clinical features

It occurs most commonly in the sixth decade of life.
 External signs include dilated episcleral blood vessels (sentinel vessels). Extraocular erosion may produce a dark mass beneath the conjunctiva.
 Pressure on the lens by the enlarging tumor can cause astigmatism, subluxation of the lens and formation of a localised lens opacity.
 The tumor can erode forward through the iris root and mimic an iris melanoma.
 Retinal detachment can be rarely caused by posterior extension of the tumor.
 Anterior uveitis is an uncommon presentation and occurs due to tumor necrosis.
 Cirumferentially growing tumors carry a bad prognosis as they are diagnosed late.
 At times the tumor is detected as an incidental finding during routine examination.

The tumour is usually diagnosed by clinical examination with a slit-lamp utilising a triple mirror contact lens. Ultrasonography and fine-needle aspiration biopsy (FNAB) are also sometimes helpful in confirming the diagnosis.

Treatment

Enucleation (surgical removal of the eye) is the treatment of choice for large ciliary body melanomas. Small or medium sized tumors may be treated by an iridocyclectomy. Radiotherapy may be appropriate in selected cases.

See also
 Ocular oncology
Uveal melanoma – melanoma of the eye

References

 Ciliary Body Melanoma – Springer
 Long-term survival in choroidal and ciliary body melanoma after enucleation versus plaque radiation therapy
 Microvascular Density in Predicting Survival of Patients with Choroidal and Ciliary Body Melanoma
 Long-term risk of local failure after proton therapy for choroidal/ciliary body melanoma
 Survival, anatomic, and functional long-term results in choroidal and ciliary body melanoma after ruthenium brachytherapy (15 years’ experience with beta-rays)
 Matched group study of surgical resection versus cobalt-60 plaque radiotherapy for primary... - Abstract - Europe PubMed Central

Ocular neoplasia